The discography of Judy Collins, an American singer and songwriter, consists of 36 studio albums, nine live albums, numerous compilation albums, four holiday albums, and 21 singles. She has two Platinum certified albums, which includes a greatest hits collection, and four Gold certified albums. Eleven of her singles have charted on the Billboard Hot 100, with five of them hitting the Top 40, and twelve have charted on the Billboard Adult Contemporary chart, with eleven hitting the Top 40.

Collins's debut album, A Maid of Constant Sorrow, was released in 1961 and consisted of traditional folk songs. She had her first charting single with "Hard Lovin' Loser" (No. 97) from her 1966 album In My Life, but it was the lead single from her 1967 album Wildflowers, Joni Mitchell's "Both Sides, Now", that gave Collins international prominence. The single reached No. 8 on the Billboard Pop Singles chart and won Collins her first Grammy Award for Best Folk Performance, while Wildflowers went Gold. Collins experienced the biggest success of her career with her recording of Stephen Sondheim's "Send in the Clowns" from her 1975 album Judith. The single peaked at No. 36 on the Billboard Pop Singles chart in 1975 and then again in 1977 at No. 19, spending 27 non-consecutive weeks on the chart and earning Collins a Grammy Award nomination for Best Pop Vocal Performance, Female, as well as a Grammy Award for Sondheim for Song of the Year. Judith would also become Collins' best-selling studio album, eventually going Platinum.

In 2017, Collins's rendition of the song "Amazing Grace" was selected for preservation in the National Recording Registry by the Library of Congress as being "culturally, historically, or artistically significant". In 2019 at the age of 80, Collins scored her first No. 1 album on an American Billboard Chart with Winter Stories, a duet album with Jonas Fjeld featuring the Chatham County Line.

Her 2022 release Spellbound, was her first album to feature all original material.Spellbound was nominated the Grammy Award for Best Folk Album, her first since Blue Skies With with Ari Hest in 2016.

Studio albums

Christmas albums

Compilation albums

Live albums

Other albums

Singles

Notes

References

Discography
Discographies of American artists
Folk music discographies